Joakim Nyström was the defending champion of the singles event at the ABN World Tennis Tournament but lost in the second round. First-seeded Stefan Edberg won the singles title after a 6–1, 6–2 win in the final against fourth-seeded John McEnroe.

Seeds

Draw

Finals

Upper half

Lower half

References

External links
 ITF tournament edition details

ABN World Tennis Tournament
1987 ABN World Tennis Tournament
March 1987 sports events in Europe